Georgi Yochev (Bulgarian: Георги Йочев born 19 September 2003) is a Bulgarian male weightlifter.

Major results

References

External links
 

2003 births
Living people
Bulgarian male weightlifters
People from Asenovgrad
European Weightlifting Championships medalists
World Weightlifting Championships medalists
21st-century Bulgarian people